The Winner (French: Un cœur gros comme ça) is a 1962 French film directed by François Reichenbach.

Reception

Awards
Won: 1961 Louis Delluc Prize
1962 Locarno International Film Festival
Won: Golden Leopard

References

External links

The Winner at Le Film Guide

1962 films
French drama films
Louis Delluc Prize winners
Films directed by François Reichenbach
Golden Leopard winners
1960s French films